Kufstein-Langkampfen Airport is a private use airport located  southwest of Kufstein, Tirol, Austria.

See also
List of airports in Austria

References

External links 
 Airport record for Kufstein-Langkampfen Airport at Landings.com

Airports in Austria
Buildings and structures in Tyrol (state)
Transport in Tyrol (state)